Maverick County is a county located in the U.S. state of Texas. As of the 2020 census, its population was 57,887. Its county seat is Eagle Pass. The county was created in 1856 and organized in 1871. It is named for Samuel Maverick, cattleman and state legislator.

The Eagle Pass, TX Micropolitan Statistical Area includes all of Maverick County. It is east of the Mexican border.

History

Native Americans

Prehistoric hunter-gatherer peoples were the first inhabitants, and their artifacts have been found in various areas of the county. Lipan Apache, Shawnee, and Coahuiltecan culture followed. The abandonment of Fort Duncan on March 20, 1861, during the Civil War, enabled the Indian population to gain control of the region; both American and Mexican inhabitants suffered tremendous loss of life and property. The fort was reoccupied in 1868. In early 1871, a number of Black Seminole Indians living along the border were organized into a company of scouts and brought to Fort Duncan.
The last Indian raid in the county occurred in 1877. Three traders were murdered and mutilated by Lipan Apaches. The site of the incident, eight miles (13 km) northeast of Eagle Pass, became known as Deadman's Hill.

Spanish explorations

The El Camino Real, later known as the Old San Antonio Road, that crosses the Rio Grande, begins in East Texas and crosses southern Maverick County. The trail was originally blazed by Alonso De León in 1690, and is said to have been traversed by more early Spanish explorers and settlers than any other section of the state. In 1989, the legislature authorized the Old San Antonio Road Preservation Commission to coordinate the 1991 300th anniversary of the trail's founding.

Saltillo alcade Fernando de Azcué in 1665 pursued Indians into the county. In 1675, Fernando del Bosque traversed the area near Quemado, and Franciscans with the expedition are said to have celebrated the first Mass on Texas soil.
In 1688, Alonso De León followed the Camino Real across the county en route to Fort St. Louis. Domingo Terán de los Ríos, the first Governor of Spanish Texas, led an expedition through the county in 1691.   Spanish Texas Governor Martín de Alarcón crossed the county in 1718 on the expedition that resulted in the founding of San Antonio.
Governor of the Mexican provinces of Coahuila and Texas, Marqués de San Miguel de Aguayo, in 1720 passed through on an expedition that brought goats, 2800 horses and 6400 sheep that was the onset of Spanish ranching in Texas. Pedro de Rivera y Villalón crossed the county in 1727 as part of an expedition to inspect the frontier defenses of New Spain.

Early settlers

Antonio Rivas was the first known rancher on the land in 1765. The county still has a considerable ranching community.

On March 27, 1849, Capt. Sidney Burbank established Fort Duncan, previously known as Camp Eagle Pass, on a site two miles (3 km) north of the ford at Adjuntos Pass.

General William Leslie Cazneau, credited several years earlier with burying the Alamo casualties with full military honors, began ranching in the area around 1850. He partnered with Irish-born San Antonio banker and county settler John Twohig to lay out a plan of Eagle Pass in 1850. That same year, a Mexican garrison established Piedras Negras across the border.

Freight operator Friedrich Wilhelm Carl Groos secured a contract to haul supplies for the army at Fort Duncan. At his urging, several early settlers of Eagle Pass were emigres of the Mexican river villages and missions of San Juan Bautista, San José, Santo Domingo, San Nicolás, La Navaja, and San Isidro.

Emigres Refugio and Rita Alderete de San Miguel used the profits of their freighting business to establish a large-scale cattle, sheep, and horse ranch on Elm Creek in 1853. They were joined in ranching operations by stranded pilgrims on the California Gold Rush trail and discharged Fort Duncan soldiers. Among these was Infantry veteran Jesse Sumpter, who also worked at many odd jobs before becoming sheriff in the newly formed Maverick County.

Landscape pioneer Frederick Law Olmsted visited Eagle Pass in 1854, and noted the many slave hunters and runaway slaves residing in Piedras Negras, as well as the many saloons and gambling houses, which catered to Fort Duncan's soldiers and other unsavory characters.

In 1855, Texas Governor Elisha M. Pease authorized a raid into Mexico. An international incident was brought about by James H. Callahan and William R. Henry, whose pursuit of Lipan Apache raiders and runaway slaves into Mexico ended in the looting and torching of Piedras Negras, after an encounter with Mexican forces at La Marama on the Río Escondido.

County established and growth

Maverick County was established from Kinney County and named for Samuel A. Maverick in 1856. The county was organized some years later on September 4, 1871. The estimated population of the county in 1860 was 726. Eagle Pass voted 83–3 against secession from the Union.

Fort Duncan was occupied by Confederate troops during the Civil War. Eagle Pass was chosen as a trade depot for the Military Board of Texas. Eagle Pass was a major terminus of the Cotton Road, custom house and Confederate port of entry into Mexico 1863–65. A cotton press was installed at Piedras Negras to handle the enormous quantities coming across the Rio Grande. At the close of the Civil War, General Joseph Orville Shelby's brigade never surrendered, but hoped to continue their fight across the border. On July 4, 1865, Shelby stopped in the middle of the Rio Grande to bury the last Confederate flag to fly over his troops. To the sound of drum and bugle, he wrapped the flag around the plume of his hat, weighted it with a stone from the river bank, and lowered it into the river. Shelby's unit became known as “The Undefeated” and was used as a basis for the 1969 John Wayne-Rock Hudson film by the same name.

Saloons, gambling houses, and smuggling operations proliferated in and around Eagle Pass during Reconstruction. The infamous J. King Fisher and his followers dominated the era in the region.

Telegraph lines reached Eagle Pass in 1875. In 1880, the main line of the Galveston, Harrisburg, and San Antonio Railway was extended west from San Antonio, connecting to the Mexican Railway in Piedras Negras.

Irrigation has been vital to area farmers. In 1885, rancher Patrick W. Thomson formed the Eagle Pass Irrigation Company to construct a huge gravity-flow irrigation system to draw water from the Rio Grande. Thompson died in 1910, but his efforts came to fruition as the Maverick County Irrigation Canal system, operational by April 1932.

March 3, 1911, when Lt. Benjamin D. Foulois and Philip O. Parmalee made the first official military reconnaissance flight, looking for Army troops between Laredo and Eagle Pass, Texas, with a ground exercise in progress. In 1942, the Army Air Force built a single-engine advanced flying school 12 mi (19 km) north of Eagle Pass.

Oil and gas exploration in the county began in the 1950s, with the largest fields being the 1969 Fitzpatrick and Wipff, and the 1970 Burr.

The coal industry of Maverick County is located along a section of the Olmos Coal Formation immediately north of Eagle Pass. Mining operations developed by Dolch at Dolchburg and by the Olmos Coal, Coke, and Oil Company at Olmos were the largest coal producers in Texas around the turn of the 20th century.

Industries located in the county in 1977 included a cotton gin and two cattle feedlots with capacities of 25,000 cattle at El Indio, one at Normandy, and another between Eagle Pass and El Indio. A spinach-packing shed was at the southern edge of Eagle Pass. Industries which have located in the Eagle Pass–Maverick County area since 1977 include the Eagle Pass Manufacturing Company (a division of Hicks-Ponder, Inc) and the Williamson-Dickie Manufacturing Co, both makers of work clothing; the Reynolds Mining Corp fluorspar plant and the Tejas Barite plant; Alta-Verde Industries and Maverick Beef Producers, and the Big River Catfish Farm.

In 1982, 88 percent of all land in the county was considered farmland and ranches, but only 2 percent of the farmland was under cultivation, and most of that was irrigated. Primary crops were hay, oats, and wheat.

Geography 

Major highways
  U.S. Highway 57
  U.S. Highway 277
  State Highway 131
  Loop 480

Adjacent counties and municipios

 Kinney County (north)
 Zavala County (east)
 Dimmit County (east)
 Uvalde County (northeast)
 Webb County (south)
 Guerrero, Coahuila, México (south)
 Jiménez, Coahuila, Mexico (west)
 Piedras Negras, Coahuila, Mexico (south)

Demographics 

As of the 2020 United States census, there were 57,887 people, 16,647 households, and 13,402 families residing in the county.

As of the census of 2000, 47,297 people, 13,089 households, and 11,230 families resided in the county. The population density was 37 people per square mile (14/km2). There were 14,889 housing units at an average density of 12 per square mile (4/km2). The racial makeup of the county was 70.89% White, 0.31% Black or African American, 1.34% Native American, 0.39% Asian, 0.04% Pacific Islander, 24.08% from other races, and 2.95% from two or more races. About 95% of the population were Hispanic or Latino of any race.

Of the 13,089 households, 51.60% had children under the age of 18 living with them, 66.50% were married couples living together, 16.00% had a female householder with no husband present, and 14.20% were not families. About 12.90% of all households were made up of individuals, and 6.60% had someone living alone who was 65 years of age or older. The average household size was 3.60 and the average family size was 3.98.

In the county, the population was distributed as 36.90% under the age of 18, 9.20% from 18 to 24, 26.70% from 25 to 44, 17.70% from 45 to 64, and 9.50% who were 65 years of age or older. The median age was 28 years. For every 100 females, there were 91.90 males. For every 100 females age 18 and over, there were 86.40 males.

The median income for a household in the county was $21,232, and for a family was $23,614. Males had a median income of $20,956 versus $15,662 for females. The per capita income for the county was $8,758. About 34.80% of the population and 32.00% of families were below the poverty line. Of the total population, 40.60% of those under the age of 18 and 40.90% of those 65 and older were living below the poverty line. Based on per capita income, Maverick County is one of the poorest counties in the United States.

According to the 2000 census, Maverick County has the nation's highest percentage of people who speak Spanish at home, at 91%.

Politics 
Like most of heavily Hispanic South Texas, Maverick County is strongly Democratic. In 1972, Maverick County was one of the only counties in Texas where George McGovern received a majority of the vote. The last Republican to carry the county was Herbert Hoover in 1928. In recent times it cast a majority of its votes for U.S. Senator John Kerry in the 2004 U.S. presidential election. President George W. Bush received 4,025 votes to Kerry's 5,948. In the 2008 U.S. presidential election it cast a higher majority of 8,554 votes for Barack Obama.

The county is located in Texas Senate, District 19 so is represented by Democrat Roland Gutierrez in the Texas Senate. As part of the 74th district of the Texas House of Representatives it is represented by Democrat Eddie Morales. In the United States House of Representatives it is part of Texas's 23rd congressional district, which has a Cook Partisan Voting Index of R+1 and is represented by Republican Tony Gonzales.

Education
All of Maverick County is served by the Eagle Pass Independent School District.

According to the Texas Education Code, Southwest Texas Junior College is the county's designated community college.

Sul Ross State University also serves this community through its Eagle Pass Campus.

Communities

City
 Eagle Pass (county seat)

Census-designated places 

 Chula Vista
 Eidson Road
 El Indio
 Elm Creek
 Fabrica
 Las Quintas Fronterizas
 Normandy
 Quemado
 Radar Base
 Rosita
 Seco Mines
 Siesta Acres

See also

 National Register of Historic Places listings in Maverick County, Texas
 Recorded Texas Historic Landmarks in Maverick County

References

External links

 Maverick County government's website
 
 Maverick County Profile from the Texas Association of Counties
 Historic Maverick County materials, hosted by the Portal to Texas History.
 "Eagle Pass Rising," a grouping of articles on the growth of Eagle Pass, Texas

 
1871 establishments in Texas
Populated places established in 1871
Majority-minority counties in Texas
Hispanic and Latino American culture in Texas